Artume (also called Aritimi, Artames, or Artumes) was an Etruscan goddess who was the mistress of animals, goddess of human assemblies, and hunting deity of Neolithic origin. Etruscans later appropriated the Greek goddess Artemis. Aritimi was also considered the founder of the Etruscan town Aritie which is today the Italian town Arezzo.

Artume in popular culture
Artume appeared as a recurring character in Marvel Comics. However, this is not the goddess, but a daughter of Hippolyta in Marvel Comics, similar to how her DC counterpart uses the goddess's Roman name.

There exists the Artume String Quartet, a UK-based all-female ensemble.

References

Animal goddesses
Etruscan goddesses
Hunting goddesses
Marvel Comics Amazons